The Copa de la Reina de Baloncesto 2012–13 was the 51st edition of the Spanish Queen's Basketball Cup. It is managed by the Spanish Basketball Federation – FEB and was held in Zamora, in the Pabellón Ángel Nieto on March 9–10, 2013. Tintos de Toro Caja Rural was the host team. Rivas Ecópolis won its second Copa de la Reina title.

Venue

Qualified teams 
The top four qualified after the first half of the LFB Regular Season will qualify to the tournament.

Draw 
The draw was held in Zamora on March 2, 2013.

Bracket

Semi finals

Final

References and notes

External links 
 2013 Copa de la Reina official website
 Official guidebook

2013
2012–13 in Spanish women's basketball
2012–13 in Spanish basketball cups